The Port de l'Embouchure is one of the two ports located in Toulouse on the Canal du Midi. The other being the Port Saint-Sauveur. This port is located in the basin at the Ponts Jumeaux.  From the basin are found the entrances to the canals Canal de Garonne, Canal du Midi and Canal de Brienne.

References

Canal du Midi
Transport in Toulouse
Ports and harbours of France
Buildings and structures in Toulouse